Bondi Sands is an Australian self tanning brand. The brand specialises in self tanners, suncare, skincare, and cosmetics. The business was established in 2012 and operates in Oceania as well as the USA, UK & Europe.

Bondi Sands products are stocked in over 30,000 retail stores worldwide.

History of brand and international expansion 
The Bondi Sands brand was created in 2012 in Melbourne, Australia by Shaun Wilson and Blair James. The brand is named after Australia's famous Bondi Beach.

In 2012, the founders offered their products to the retailer Priceline. The chain agreed to sell three Bondi Sands products. As of 2021, Bondi Sands holds 60 percent of the market share in Australia.

In 2013, Bondi Sands launched in New Zealand. The brand's products appeared in Greencross, Farmers and Countdown.

Bondi Sands entered the British market in 2015. The company started distributing through British retailers Superdrug and Boots. In 2018, Bondi Sands launched in Ireland and the Netherlands. In the same year, the company became one of the largest Australian owned beauty brand exporters.

The brand soon distributed through American retailer, Walgreens, and began selling in pharmacy stores on January 1, 2019. During the year, Bondi Sands products were available in over 7,700 Walgreens stores, the largest launch of an Australian beauty brand in the United States.  The company also distributes through other American beauty stores such as Ulta Beauty, Target, CVS and Rite Aid.

USA customers account for 80 percent of the company's online sales.

In 2019, Bondi Sands appeared in Norway and Germany.

Bondi Sands started its expansion into the Canadian market in 2020.

The brand opened on Chinese Tmall in 2021. At the same time, Bondi Sands products appeared on Chinese e-commerce platforms including Little Red Book and TaoBao. In 2021, the brand released the first sustainable line called Pure. All products in the line are packaged in ethically sourced, 100% recyclable packaging.  The company has also started cooperating with Australian charity Take 3 for the Sea. During World Earth Month, Bondi Sands donated $25,000 to Take 3 for the Sea.

In the same year, the brand signed a three-year deal with the Australian Open and became the Official Sunscreen Partner, promoting their range of Sport SPF 50+ Sunscreen products. Bondi Sands was also a partner in all events of the Summer Series 2021.

In October 2022, the brand celebrated their 10th anniversary and launched a limited edition version of their Dark Self Tanning Foam along with a ‘scratch and win’ component.

Product range 
Bondi Sands has a range of 56 products in the following categories:

Self Tanning
 Self Tanning Accessories
 Suncare
 Skincare
 Professional Salon Solutions
Cosmetics 
The company's products are manufactured across three facilities in Melbourne. Bondi Sands has offices in Melbourne, Los Angeles and London.

Bondi Sands products are vegan, cruelty free and Peta certified. The company is committed to sustainable practices, where by 2025 all packaging will be fully recyclable and contain recyclable materials.

Brand ambassadors 
Bondi Sands operates a global ambassador program involving Kylie Jenner, James Charles, Tammy Hembrow, Carli Bybel, Natalie Halcro, Charlotte Crosby, Holly Hagan, Gary Beadle, Megan McKenna and Michael Finch promoting the range. The latest ambassador for Bondi Sands is Miss Universe 2012, model Olivia Culpo.

Throughout the Australian Open Bondi Sands has worked with Tennis stars, where in 2021 Daria Gavrilova was their official brand ambassador, and in 2022 former Tennis World Champion Lleyton Hewitt and his son, Cruz Hewitt partnered with the brand.

Business model 
Bondi Sands develops its Instagram and TikTok pages, collaborates with bloggers and influencers, and works on brand awareness. The brand highlights the Australian beach lifestyle of the sand, sea and sun, emulating this to their global community. The company is trying to change the attitude to tanning and skin health.

Coachella activation 
Bondi Sands launched the latest innovation in Self Tanning in April 2019, Aero Aerated Self Tanning Foam. Thanks to its Coachella activation, the worldwide Aero product launch saw the brand break into the top ten skin care brands with $2.9million EMV. It saw a 234% increase in month-over-month growth.

The Coachella activation was supported by Australian, UK and US influencers who attended the Aero launch party.  After the party, Aero became the best-selling product in Walgreens.

Bondi Sands added a fifth product to the Aero range, Aero Ultra Dark in January 2020.

Australian Bushfires 
In support of relief efforts for the 2019–20 Australian bushfire season, Bondi Sands donated $100,000 divided between the Salvation Army and WIRES Wildlife Rescue. They also created two reusable frank green products, with 100% of all proceeds being donated to the Red Cross to support community recovery across Australia.

Awards 

 Allure Best In Beauty Awards 2020 – Best Self Tanner
 Bondi Sands Aeros Self-Tanning Foam
 2019 Glosscar Awards – Best Self-Tanning Product
 Bondi Sands Liquid Gold Self Tanning Foam
 Beauty Heaven Best in Beauty Awards 2018 – Best Self-Tanning Product
 Bondi Sands 1 Hour Express Self-Tanning Foam
 Beauty Heaven Best in Beauty Awards 2018 – Best Self-Tanning Accessory
 Bondi Sands Self Tanning Mitt
 Beauty Heaven Best in Beauty Awards 2018 – Best Self-Tan Remover
 Bondi Sands Self Tan Eraser
 Beauty Heaven Best in Beauty Awards 2018 – Best Self-Tanning Product (Editor’s Choice)
 Bondi Sands 1 Hour Express Self Tanning Foam
 InStyle’s 101 Best Beauty Buys 2018 – Best Gradual Tan
 Bondi Sands Gradual Tanning Foam
 Canstar 2018 Awards – Customer Satisfaction: Self-Tan
 Beauty Heaven 2016 Awards - Best in Beauty 2016
 Exfoliator Mitt
 Shout Magazine Beauty Awards 2016 – Best Gradual Tan
 Gradual Tanning Foam
 Dolly Beauty Awards 2016 – Best Gradual Tan
 Gradual Tanning Foam
 Harpers Bazaar Best of the Best 2015 – Best Gradual Tan
 Gradual Tanning Milk with SPF 15
 Women's Health & Fitness. Best All-Rounder
 Bondi Sands Self Tanning Foam Dark
 Gradual Tanning Milk with SPF 15 POPSUGAR Australian Beauty Awards Vote for Best Self Tanner

References

External links 

 Official Australian Site
 Official UK site
 Official US site
 Official European site

Sun tanning
Cosmetics brands